Inata is a town in Soum Province, Burkina Faso. Inata is well known for its gold mine.

History 
Three workers at the local gold mine, including two foreigners, were kidnapped in September 2018 by jihadist fighters. Both were eventually released in 2019.

The attack was one of the influencing factors in the January 2022 Burkina Faso coup d'état.

See also 

 Djibo, which is nearby

References 

Soum Province
Populated places in the Sahel Region
Jihadist insurgency in Burkina Faso
Gold mines in Burkina Faso